There are at least 29 named lakes and reservoirs in Clay County, Arkansas.

Lakes
 Alligator Hole, el.  
 Beaver Pond, el.  
 Big Lake, el.  
 Corning Lake, el.  
 Field Lake, el.  
 Flat Lake, el.  
 Little Taylor Lake, el.  
 Long Lake, el.  
 Lost Lake, el.  
 Mill Lake, el.  
 Murphy Lake, el.  
 Old River, el.  
 Old River Lake, el.  
 Peoples Lake, el.  
 Poyner Lake, el.  
 Taylor Lake, el.  
 Victory Lake, el.  
 Woods Lake, el.  
 Woolfolk Lake, el.

Reservoirs
 Brigance Lake, el.  
  Cole Lake, el.  
 Copeland Lake, el.  
 Easterwood Lake, el.  
 Frie Lake, el.  
 Grazevich Lake, el.  
 Hughes Lake, el.  
 Moore Lake, el.  
 Nicholas Lake, el.

See also
 List of lakes in Arkansas

Notes

Bodies of water of Clay County, Arkansas
Clay